Da Nang or Danang is a class-1 municipality and the fifth-largest city in Vietnam by municipal population. It lies on the coast of the East Sea of Vietnam at the mouth of the Hàn River, and is one of Vietnam's most important port cities. As one of the country's five direct-controlled municipalities, it falls under the administration of the central government.

Da Nang is the commercial and educational centre of Central Vietnam and is the largest city in the region. It has a well-sheltered, easily accessible port, and its location on National Route 1 and the North–South Railway makes it a transport hub. It is within  of several UNESCO World Heritage Sites, including the Imperial City of Huế, the Old Town of Hội An, and the Mỹ Sơn ruins. Before 1997, the city was part of Quang Nam - Da Nang Province.

On 1 January 1997, Da Nang was separated from Quảng Nam Province to become one of four centrally controlled municipalities in Vietnam. Da Nang is designated as a first class city, and has a higher urbanization ratio than any of Vietnam's other provinces or centrally governed cities.

Da Nang has a Human Development Index of 0.779 (high), ranking fifth among all municipalities and provinces of Vietnam.

Names and etymology

Most of the names by which Da Nang has been known make reference to its position at the Hàn River estuary. The city's present name is generally agreed to be a Vietnamese adaptation of the Cham word da nak, which is translated as "opening of a large river".

Other Chamic sources, with similar definitions, have been proposed. Inrasara (aka Phú Trạm), a researcher specializing in Champa, suggests Da Nang is a variation of the Cham word daknan (lit. "the large water"); Sakaya (aka Văn Món), another Champa researcher, claims a connection with the Raglai word danang, meaning "river source".

Another name given to Da Nang was Cửa Hàn (lit. "mouth of the Han [river]"). The name used by the French, Tourane, is said to derive from this name, by way of a rough transliteration. Notably, this name (spelled "Cua han") appears on maps of the area drafted by Alexandre de Rhodes in 1650. The name Kean (cf. Kẻ Hàn, roughly "Han market") was another name purportedly used during the 17th century to refer to the land at the foot of the Hải Vân Pass.

Other names referring to Da Nang include:
Vũng Thùng, a colloquial name which survives in folklore.
Trà Úc, Trà Áo, Trà Sơn and Đồng Long Loan, literary names used by Confucian scholars.
 In Chinese, Danang is known as Xiangang, this is derived from the old name 蜆港 ("Clam Harbor"). 
Thái Phiên, a name used briefly after the 1945 August Revolution, commemorating Thái Phiên, the leader of popular revolts during the 1916 Duy Tân Resistance.

History

Ancient Vietnam 

The city's origins date back to the ancient kingdom of Champa, established in 192 AD. At its peak, the Chams' sphere of influence stretched from Huế to Vũng Tàu. Also in the region of Da Nang were the ancient Cham city of Singhapura ("City of the Lion"), the location of which has been identified with an archeological site in the modern village of Trà Kiệu, and the valley of Mỹ Sơn, where a number of ruined temples and towers can still be viewed.

In the latter half of the 10th century, the kings of Indrapura came into conflict with the Đại Việt, who were then based at Hoa Lư near modern Hanoi. Champa had been independent, it found itself in need to defend its territory to contain the threat posed by the Khmer Empire in the west, and expand its territory to the north, hoping to conquer the Vietnamese nation. There, with the Vietnamese Kingdom in turmoil following the assassination of Đinh Tiên Hoàng, Champa made an unsuccessful attempt to invade Đại Việt in 979 with support of China, but failed due to the strong defence of Vietnamese territory under the command of Lê Hoàn. In 982, three ambassadors sent to Champa by Emperor Lê Hoàn of the Đại Việt (founder of the Early Lê dynasty) were detained in Indrapura. Lê Hoàn decided to go on the offensive, sacking Indrapura and killing the Cham King Parameshvaravarman I. As a result of these setbacks, the Cham eventually abandoned Indrapura around 1000 AD.

The Đại Việt campaign against Champa continued into the late 11th century, when the Cham were forced to cede their three northern provinces to the rulers of the Lý dynasty. Soon afterward, Vietnamese farmers began moving into the untilled former Cham lands, turning them into rice fields and moving relentlessly southward, delta by delta, along the narrow coastal plain. The southward expansion of Đại Việt (known as Nam Tiến) continued for several centuries, culminating in the annexation of most of the Cham territories by the end of the 15th century.

Western contact

One of the first Europeans to visit Da Nang was Portuguese explorer António de Faria, who anchored in Da Nang in 1535. Faria was one of the first Westerners to write about the area and, through his influence, Portuguese ships began to call regularly at Hội An, which was then a much more important port than Da Nang. Throughout the 17th and 18th centuries, French and Spanish traders and missionaries regularly made landfall at Hội An, just south of Đà Nẵng. An American, John White, arrived at Da Nang (then called Turon) on 18 June 1819 in the brig Franklin of Salem, Massachusetts, and was advised that the country was recovering from devastating wars, and that what little goods had been produced in the area was already allocated. Other American ships arriving shortly after were the Marmion of Boston, and the Aurora and Beverly of Salem.

Conditions were such due to the wars that they were unable to conduct trade, and the subsequent missions of East India Company agent John Crawfurd in 1823 and the two missions of Andrew Jackson's agent, American diplomat Edmund Roberts, in 1833 and 1836 were unable to secure trade agreements due to the exceptionally poor quality of the port. Following the edict of Emperor Minh Mạng in 1835, prohibiting European vessels from making landfall or pursuing trade except at Đà Nẵng, its port quickly superseded Hội An as the largest commercial port in the central region.

French Indochina 

In 1847, French vessels dispatched by Admiral Cécille bombarded Đà Nẵng, ostensibly on the grounds of alleged persecution of Roman Catholic missionaries. In August 1858, once again ostensibly on the grounds of religious persecution, French troops, led by Admiral Charles Rigault de Genouilly, and under the orders of Napoleon III, landed in Đà Nẵng as part of the punitive Cochinchina Campaign.

The French overpowered the Vietnamese stationed in Da Nang, swiftly occupying the city and Tiên Sa peninsula (present-day Sơn Trà peninsula). The occupying forces were quickly placed under siege by the Vietnamese army under the command of Nguyễn Tri Phương, and were eventually forced to retreat in March 1860. The French were able to invade the southern stronghold of Saigon and, in June 1862, several provinces of southern Vietnam were ceded to the French as Cochinchina with the signing of the Treaty of Saigon.

Through two more decades of conflict, the French gradually strengthened their hold on Vietnam, culminating in the establishment of French Indochina in October 1887. Two years later, in 1889, the French colonists renamed the city Tourane, placing it under the control of the governor general of French Indochina. It came to be considered one of Indochina's five major cities, among Hanoi, Saigon–Cholon, Haiphong, and Huế.

Republic of Vietnam (South Vietnam) 

During the Vietnam War, what is now the Da Nang International Airport was a major air base used by the South Vietnamese and United States Air Forces.

The base became one of the world's busiest aircraft hubs during the war, reaching an average of 2,595 aircraft traffic operations daily, more than any other airport and airbase in the world at that time. The final U.S. ground combat operations in Vietnam ceased on 13 August 1972, when a residual force of the 196th Light Infantry Brigade stood down in Đà Nẵng. B Battery 3rd Battalion, 82nd Field Artillery Regiment fired the final U.S. artillery round and the 3rd Battalion, 21st Infantry Regiment finished their final patrols. This residual force was known as "Operation Gimlet". 
After the US withdrawal from the conflict, in the final stage of the conquest of South Vietnam by North Vietnam, Da Nang fell to the communist forces March 29–30, 1975. Vietnam issued two special postage stamps to commemorate this event, within its "total liberation" stamp set issued 14 December 1976.

After 1975 
Since the era of the construction of the Socialist Republic of Vietnam, Danang has become essentially the third city after Ho Chi Minh City and Hanoi to be an important urban centre of the central region of Vietnam. Danang boasts numerous educational institutes as well as important sites of economy.

Geography 

Da Nang is the largest city in central Vietnam and one of the country's most important ports. The city is surrounded by mountains to the west, and the South China Sea to the east. Da Nang borders Thừa Thiên-Huế Province across the Hải Vân Pass to the north, along with the Quảng Nam Province to the south and west.

Geology and topography 
Geologically, Da Nang is at the edge of a Paleozoic fold belt known as the Truong Son Orogenic Zone, whose main deformation occurred during the early Carboniferous period.

Climate 
Da Nang has a tropical monsoon climate with two seasons: a typhoon and wet season from September to December and a dry season from January to August. Cold waves can occasionally occur, although they are of short duration. Temperatures are highest between June and August with mean temperatures of ), and lowest between December and February (mean temperature of ). The annual average for humidity is 81%, with highs between October and January (reaching 84–86%) and lows between June and August (reaching 75–77%).

On average, Da Nang receives  of rainfall. Rainfall is typically highest between September and November (ranging from ) and lowest between February and April (ranging from ). Da Nang receives an average of 2156 hours of sunlight annually, with highs between 234 and 277 hours per month in May and June and lows between 69 and 165 hours per month in November and December.

Demographics 

Women make up 50.7% of Da Nang's population.

Population growth
Da Nang's population has been growing at rates of between 2.5% and 3% during most of the years between 2005 and 2011, significantly exceeding the national average of 1% to 1.2%. The growth rate briefly rose to 3.6% in 2010 before returning to its long-term trend with 2.68% in 2011. This is the third fastest growth rate in the country after the two southern manufacturing centers Bình Dương Province (4.41%) and Đồng Nai Province (3.5%).

Đà Nẵng's population is estimated to reach one million inhabitants by 2014.
Migration has been the dominant factor in the city's population growth at least since 2009, contributing 1.6% to 2.7% (2010) between 2009 and 2011. Out-migration has been relatively high in 2011 at 0.79% compared to 0.34% and 0.55% in previous years, while the in-migration rate has been exceeding 2% since 2009 and was at 2.28% in 2011.

Đà Nẵng's natural population growth is only slightly higher than the national average. Its crude birth rate was recorded at 18 live births per 1000 persons. The crude death rate was measured at 6.7 per 1000 persons in 2011. Life expectancy at birth was estimated at 77.4 years for women and 72.4 years for men, or 74.8 years overall in the 2009 population census. The infant mortality rate was measured at 9.9 infant deaths per 1000 live births, less than two points above the nation's average for urban areas.

Urbanization
The city has the highest urbanization ratio among provinces and municipalities in Vietnam, containing only 11 rural communes, the fewest of any province-level unit in Vietnam. As of 2009, 86.9% of Đà Nẵng's population lived in urban areas; average annual urban population growth was 3.5%.

Politics 

The leading organ of the Communist Party in Da Nang City is the Executive Committee of the Communist Party. The current Secretary is Nguyen Van Quang.

The legislative branch of the city is the People's Council of Da Nang City. The current chairman is Luong Nguyen Minh Triet.

The executive branch of the city is the People's Committee of Da Nang City. The current chairman is Le Trung Chinh.

Administrative divisions 
The city of Da Nang is officially divided into eight district-level sub-divisions, including six urban districts (Hải Châu, Thanh Khê, Cẩm Lệ, Sơn Trà, Ngũ Hành Sơn and Liên Chiểu) and two rural districts (Hòa Vang and Hoàng Sa (Paracel Islands)). They are further subdivided into 45 wards and 11 communes. The city center of Da Nang is Hải Châu district.

Before 1997, the city was part of Quang Nam–Da Nang Province. On 1 January 1997, Da Nang was separated from Quang Nam Province to become one of five independent (centrally-controlled) municipalities in Vietnam.

Economy 

Da Nang is the leading industrial center of central Vietnam. Its GDP per capita was 19 million VND in 2007, one of the highest in Vietnam (after Hồ Chí Minh City, Hanoi, Bình Dương Province, and Đồng Nai Province). By 2009, this had increased to 27.3 million VND.

Da Nang led the Provincial Competitiveness Index rankings in 2008, 2009, and 2010 (and was second after Bình Dương Province in the three years before that), benefiting mostly from good infrastructure, good performance in labour training, transparency, proactive provincial leadership and low entry costs.

Exports increased to US$575 million in 2008, but fell back to US$475 million in 2009.

Agriculture, forestry, fishing 
Despite its status as a city, 37,800 people in Da Nang were employed in agriculture, forestry and fishing as of 2007, producing 45,000t of rice and 41,000t of fish. However, employment in these sectors had a clear negative trend in the first decade of the 21st century. Gross output has also been decreasing during the second half of the decade. Given Da Nang's lack of agricultural land (9200ha as of 2007) and its location at the coast, fishing has been contributing more to the economy than agriculture, with a gross output more than twice that of agriculture.

Industry 
Da Nang is a diversified industrial center, including industries such as machinery, electrics, chemicals, shipbuilding, and textiles. Specific industrial products include aquatic products, fabric, clothes, bricks, fertilizer, cement, soap, paper, and medical tablets. The city's industry may diversify further. EADS is planning to set up an industrial park focused on the aviation industry in Da Nang.

As of 2007, Da Nang industry was dominated by the state sector, which made up 57% of gross output. This is about the same as its share in 2000. Over 80% of the state industry is centrally managed (in other words: belongs to state corporations headquartered in Hanoi). Almost half of the rest is contributed by the foreign-invested sector, while the private domestic sector is still relatively small and has not been able to significantly increase its share compared to the state sector. Industry grew by an average of 14.8% per year from 2000 to 2007, making it the main engine of economic growth. However, it has the second lowest industrial growth rate in the South Central Coast (behind only Khanh Hoa Province). Employment has grown at an average of 5.75%, reaching 118,900 in 2007.

Trade 

Historically, Da Nang's main marketplace has been the Hàn Market, which is downtown near the west bank of the Hàn River, between Tran Phu and Bach Dang Streets. This market, much like Ben Thanh Market in Saigon, offers a wide variety of goods sold by many different vendors, such as clothing, silk, jewelry, flowers, foodstuffs such as dried fruit and fish, as well as coffee, tea and wine (including Vietnamese snake wine).

Property 
Many new construction projects are underway in Da Nang, including several beachfront resorts such as the US$130 million Hyatt Regency Danang Resort & Spa, and the Beach Resort complex (including Ocean Villas and Marriott Hotel) in Ngu Hanh Son. Another ambitious project, the US$250 million Da Phuoc International New Town aims to construct an entirely new urban area on reclaimed land on the city's north sea coast, making it the first major land reclamation project in Central Vietnam. Plans for the Đa Phước project include the erection of a hotel and several smaller resorts, a 33-story apartment block and 60-story office block, an 18-hole golf course, a marina, as well as villas and international schools.

Culture

Tourism 

The tourism sector is a vital component of Da Nang's economy. Its status as a transportation hub for central Vietnam and its proximity to several UNESCO World Heritage Sites, including the Imperial City of Hue, the Old Town of Hoi An, and the My Son ruins fuels much of its tourist activity.

Mỹ Sơn is an archaeological site dating back more than a thousand years, in Quang Nam. Located in a remote forested valley some 70 km west of Da Nang, this former capital and religious center of the Champa kingdom once contained in excess of 70 style temples and stupas. Although badly damaged by bombing raids in the 1960s, the site still has more than 20 structures and was declared a UNESCO World Heritage Site in 1999. Many statues, sculptures and reliefs recovered from Mỹ Sơn are kept in the Museum of Cham Sculpture, near the Hàn River in the heart of Da Nang. Dating from the fourth to the 14th centuries, the sensual artwork on these works depicts daily activities as well as Hindu and Buddhist religious themes.

The Marble Mountains are rocky limestone outcrops jutting out of the beach just south of Da Nang. Paths lead to the top of the forested cliffs, providing views of Non Nuoc Beach and the South China Sea. The caves in the cliffs were originally inhabited by the Cham people. Later, the Nguyen dynasty built numerous pagodas among the caves. The Marble Mountains are home to various artisans producing sculpture and artwork at its base at Non Nuoc Village.

Non Nuoc Beach is a white sandy beach on the outskirts of Đà Nẵng that is renowned for its history as an R&R destination for American troops during the Vietnam War. Today, the beach, along with Mỹ Khê beach to the north, are home to expensive resorts, surfing, and entertainment facilities. Ba Na Hills is a mountain resort with a 5 km-long cable car system which carries guests up to Ba Na's peak at 1487m above sea level. Son Tra Mountain, just some miles away from the city centre with some wild streams and resorts along the seaside. 

The central coastal city of Da Nang saw a significant growth in international tourist arrivals in 2017, according to the city's Department of Tourism. In 2017, about 6.6 million visitors came to Da Nang, up 19% over the previous year and 4.8% higher than its yearly target. The figure included 4.3 million domestic tourists, up 11.3% year-on-year.

The central city earned over VND19.4 trillion (US$853.96 million) in revenue, an increase of 20.6% from 2016. Statistics also show that the city witnessed an impressive increase in the number of visitors by air which stood at over 1.58 million, up 74.4% while by-car visitors via Thailand and Laos was estimated at 14,120.

Cuisine 
Central Vietnamese cuisine, particularly the cuisine of Da Nang, is well known through Vietnam, and growing in popularity internationally. Da Nang is famous for its flavorful dishes, such as Mì Quảng, Bún chả cá (fish ball noodle soup),Bánh tráng cuốn thịt heo( Dry pancake roll with pork), Banh xeo (Crispy pancake), Nem lui (Lemongrass Pork Skewers).

Sport 

Da Nang's football club, SHB Da Nang F.C., play in the V-League, Vietnam's top professional football league. They are currently one of the most highly ranked teams in that league, having emerged from competition as champions of the 2009 V-League. In the same year, they also completed the double by winning the Vietnamese Cup. They also qualified for the 2010 AFC Champions League and the 2010 AFC Cup; although they did not advance past the qualifying play-off in the Champions League, they advanced to the quarter-finals of the AFC Cup after defeating Becamex Bình Dương in extra time. Several Da Nang F.C. players also play for the Vietnam national team, including defender Võ Hoàng Quảng and midfielder Phan Thanh Hưng. SHB Da Nang F.C. play their home games at the Chi Lăng Stadium, a 30,000-seat stadium in Hải Châu District.

Education 

There are several universities located in Da Nang, with campuses in many locations throughout the city, as well as satellite campuses in surrounding regions.

 University of Da Nang, with a number of member colleges:
 Technology
 Technology and Education
 Economics
 Pedagogy
 Foreign Languages
 Information Technology
 Kon Tum campus
 English Language Institute
 Da Nang University of Medical Technology, Medicine and Pharmacy
 Da Nang University of Sport
 Duy Tan University, private university
 Dong A University, private university
 Da Nang University of Architecture
 The American University of Vietnam (AUV), private university
The city has 17 high schools, of which Le Quy Don High School for the Gifted is among the leading high schools in Vietnam.

There is also a sizable presence of overseas education representatives in Da Nang. Campus France, is a French-government agency in Da Nang city which promotes the learning of the French language, and supports students in the city and the surrounding province in the location of study opportunities in the higher education system in France. The consultation service provided by CampusFrance is free of charge. English Language Institute is a learning center built by the University of Queensland, Australia, targeting English teaching in addition to serving as an IELTS testing provider. Singapore International School is an international school in Da Nang.

Infrastructure

Health 
Da Nang has a number of hospitals, including:
 Da Nang Hospital
 C Hospital
 Da Nang Oncology Hospital
 Da Nang Hospital for Women and Children.
 Da Nang Hospital for Traumatology and Orthopaedics.
 Women's Hospital
 Dermatology and Venereology
 Traditional medicine
 Vinmec Da Nang International Hospital

Acute Respiratory Distress Syndrome (ARDS) is also known as "Da Nang lung" as many cases occurring during the Vietnam War were treated at a medical centre in Da Nang.

Transportation 

Đà Nẵng is at the end of the East–West Economic Corridor (EWEC), which stretches over Vietnam, Laos, Thailand, and Burma (Myanmar).

By air 

Da Nang International Airport, located at the centre of the city, is the third largest international airport in Vietnam. It is an important gateway to access central Vietnam. The airport was known as Da Nang Air Base during the Vietnam War, during which time it was described as the world's busiest airport. During the month of May 1968, the base reached an average of 2,595 air traffic operations daily, more than any airport in the world. As of June 2011, the airport has domestic connections to Hanoi, Ho Chi Minh City, Haiphong, Vinh, Buon Ma Thuot, Da Lat, Nha Trang, and Can Tho, as well as international connections to Seoul (South Korea), Tokyo (Japan), Singapore, and Taipei (Taiwan).

Beginning 16 December 2011, Air Asia, a Malaysian low-cost carrier, began offering four flights a week between Đà Nẵng and Kuala Lumpur. A new international terminal opened in December 2011 allowing further connections to destinations such as Phnom Penh (Cambodia), Thailand, Hong Kong, Japan, and Australia.

As of November 2015, Da Nang International airport has been undergoing extensive renovations.

By land 

Da Nang is a major station along the North–South Railway, also known as the Reunification Express. National Highways 1 and 14B run through the city, providing road connections to Hanoi in the north and Ho Chi Minh City in the south, as well as the Central Highlands and Laos to the west. The Hai Pass is a mountain pass separating Da Nang and Thừa Thiên Huế Province, where Highway 1A passes through. To cut down on transit time and the danger to motorists from navigating the twisting mountain road, the Hải Vân Tunnel was built, opening in 2005. It is the longest tunnel in south-east Asia at 6.28 km, and allows motorists to save between 30 minutes and an hour on traveling times over the old Hải Vân Pass route. An expressway between Da Nang and nearby Quang Ngai is also in the planning stages. 

Several bridges cross the Han River and its tributaries in Da Nang, including the iconic Han River Bridge, Tran Thi Ly Bridge, Nguyen Van Troi Bridge, Tuyen Son Bridge and the recently completed Thuan Phuoc Bridge, which is the longest suspension bridge in Vietnam. The Dragon River Bridge will cross the Han River at the Le Dinh Duong/Bach Dang roundabout, offering tourists coming from Đà Nẵng International Airport a more direct route to My Khe and Non Nuoc beaches, along the city's eastern edge.

By sea 

Da Nang's port system is the third largest in Vietnam after Ho Chi Minh City and Haiphong. In 2008, Da Nang's port handled 2.7 million tons of cargo, of which 1.2 million tons were exports, 525,900 tons were imports, and 985,600 tons were domestic cargo. Over 29,600 passengers passed through the port in 2008, a significant increase over previous years. The port system consists of two areas: Tiên Sa Seaport, and Song Hàn Terminal. Vietnam National Shipping Lines (Vinalines) is the port authority for Đà Nẵng's port system.

Despite the fact that the port's infrastructure is not specifically designed to accommodate cruise ships, the number of large cruise ships docking at Da Nang Port has increased in recent years. In the first two months of 2010 alone, 12 cruise ships docked in Da Nang, carrying 6,477 passengers.

In recent years, cruise ships tend to dock at Chân Mây Port, which is located 50 km from Da Nang through the Hải Vân Tunnel.

International relations

Twin towns - sister cities

Da Nang is twinned with:

 Battambang, Cambodia
 Champasak, Laos
 Changwon, South Korea
 Daegu, South Korea
 Haiphong, Vietnam
 Khon Kaen, Thailand
 Kunming, China
 Mukdahan, Thailand
 Oakland, United States
 Pittsburgh, United States
 Savannakhet, Laos
 Tangier, Morocco
 Timișoara, Romania
 Toluca, Mexico

Cooperation and friendship
In addition to its twin towns, Da Nang cooperates with:

 Attapeu, Laos
 Borås, Sweden
 Grodno Region, Belarus
 Hwaseong, South Korea
 Houston, United States
 Kolkata, India
 Košice, Slovakia
 Macau, China
 Nantes, France
 Newcastle, Australia
 Nord Pas de Calais, France
 Queensland, Australia
 Rotterdam, Netherlands
 Sakai, Japan
 Salavan, Laos
 Salo, Finland
 Sekong, Laos
 Shandong Province, China
 South Australia, Australia
 Stuttgart, Germany
 Surat, India
 Walloon Region, Belgium
 Yaroslavl Oblast, Russia

Friendship port
 Kawasaki, Japan

Notes

References

External links 

Đà Nẵng government portal
 

 
190s establishments
Cities in Vietnam
Populated places in Da Nang
Port cities in Vietnam
South Central Coast
Populated places established in the 1st century